Eddie Crowder (August 26, 1931 – September 9, 2008) was an American football player and coach. He was an All-American quarterback (QB) and safety at the University of Oklahoma (OU) in the early 1950s and a successful head coach and athletic director (AD) at the University of Colorado (CU) in the 1960s and 1970s.

He is quoted as saying "Life is boring for someone trying to achieve greatness."

Early years
Born in Arkansas City, Kansas, Crowder was raised in Muskogee, Oklahoma. He played quarterback at Muskogee Central High School and won the state championship in 1948.

Playing career
Crowder was a member of Oklahoma's first National Football Championship team in 1950, and led Oklahoma to two Big Seven titles as quarterback in 1951 and 1952 and was selected all-conference the same years. Oklahoma was  during his three years as a player. He was 61 for 110 (.555) (might be 60 for 109 (.550)) with 11 touchdowns for 1189 (might be 1179) yards passing.

He was selected in the second round (22nd overall) of the 1953 NFL Draft by the New York Giants, but declined due to a nerve problem in his throwing arm and served in the U.S. Army Corps of Engineers as quarterback of the Fort Hood team for 1953.

Although selected by the Giants, Crowder went to Canada in 1953 and played the first half of the season with the Edmonton Eskimos, alternating starts at quarterback with Claude Arnold. He was cut by head coach Darrell Royal because of limitations on the number of American players that a team could carry past a certain date. Crowder led the Eskimos to victory in all four of his games, but Royal decided to stick with the veteran Arnold. In a game in Calgary on September 5, Crowder played the full game at quarterback without throwing a single pass; all the passes were thrown by halfbacks Rollie Miles and Billy Vessels. "Easy Ed" was one of many Oklahoma grads to play for the Eskimos in the 1950s.

Coaching career
Crowder was an assistant coach under Red Blaik at Army in 1955 and for Bud Wilkinson back at Oklahoma for seven seasons  In January 1963 at age 31, he became the head coach of the Buffaloes; his initial contract was for five years at $15,000 per year. He restored the program's respectability and earned national respect while rebuilding the program. 

In Crowder's ninth season in 1971, CU was third in the nation at 10–2, behind only Big Eight rivals Nebraska (1) and Oklahoma (2). This was the first time that two teams from the same conference topped the final poll, and it remains as the only time that a conference had the top three.

His teams went to five bowl games while he was head coach: the 1967 Bluebonnet (W), 1969 Liberty (W), 1970 Liberty (L), and 1971 Astro-Bluebonnet (W), 1972 Gator (L).

With a final annual salary of $52,800, Crowder stepped down as athletic director in 1984, succeeded by Bill Marolt.

Later years
With his wife Kate, Crowder continued to reside in Boulder after his retirement from CU. He maintained ties to both Oklahoma and Colorado football programs, and assisted in the selections of Oklahoma head coach Bob Stoops and Colorado head coach Dan Hawkins. He was also a voter in the Harris College Football Poll. Crowder battled Hodgkin's lymphoma in 2003, and died of leukemia in 2008.

Head coaching record

Awards and honors
 All-Conference (Big Seven) 1951, 1952
 All-American, 1952
 Colorado Sports Hall of Fame, 1990
 Oklahoma Sports Hall of Fame, 2003
 University of Colorado athletic hall of fame, 2004
 FWAA Citation of Honor, 2007

References

External links
University of Colorado Athletics – obituary

1931 births
2008 deaths
American football quarterbacks
Army Black Knights football coaches
Colorado Buffaloes athletic directors
Colorado Buffaloes football coaches
Deaths from leukemia
Edmonton Elks players
Oklahoma Sooners football coaches
Oklahoma Sooners football players
Sportspeople from Muskogee, Oklahoma
Coaches of American football from Kansas